Horse Shoes is a 1927 silent American comedy. Directed by Clyde Bruckman, the film stars Monty Banks and Jean Arthur. In 1928 it was given a German release by Bavaria Film.

Cast list
 Monty Banks as Monty Milde
 Ernie Wood as Henry Baker, Jr.
 Henry Barrows as Henry Baker, Sr.
 John Elliott as William Baker
 Jean Arthur as His daughter
 Arthur Thalasso as Conductor
 George French as Mayor
 Agostino Borgato as Judge
 Bert Apling as O'Toole

References

External links
 
 
 

Films directed by Clyde Bruckman
American silent feature films
American black-and-white films
1927 comedy films
1927 films
Silent American comedy films
Pathé Exchange films
1920s English-language films
1920s American films